A Day in the Park with Barney was a live children's show at Universal Studios Florida based on the children's television show, Barney & Friends, that opened in 1995 on the former site of The Bates Motel Set used in Psycho IV: The Beginning. It also had a "Barney's Backyard" playground area with a chance to meet Barney in a meet and greet session after the main show in the Barney Theater. It was one of the few places where Barney's original voice actor Bob West could still be heard and one of Universal Studios' attempts to appeal to the younger generation.

Due to the ongoing worldwide outbreak of the COVID-19 pandemic and its spread to Florida, A Day in the Park with Barney was affected many times during the reopening of Universal Studios Florida. Also, with attendance declining over the years, Universal Orlando announced the permanent closure of the show on February 3, 2021.

Show

Queue
The guests emptied from the lines into a covered pre-show area with an odd-looking house facade, covered in pipes, knobs and doors. The setting for the pre-show was decorated very much like a child would imagine it; colors, bright lights, and even a rainbow over the house. The house was owned by the pre-show's host, Mr. Peek-A-Boo who had not yet made his appearance when the guests entered into the pre-show area. Different songs and sounds were heard through the pre-show area as guests waited for the show to start, and time allowed more people to make their way into the area.

Pre-show
Patrick Alyosius Bartholomew (Mr. Peek-A-Boo for short) and his parrot, Bartholomew, were very close friends to Barney, Baby Bop and BJ. He was elderly, but only in age since his spirit was much like that of a child. Mr. Peek-A-Boo was a consistently forgetful character, trying to find the door to Barney's Park to take the children, only to remember that they had to use their imagination. He asked them to close their eyes and imagine a park, then the waterfall that blocked the door stopped, which showed that using their imagination had worked.

Main show
The theater was designed to resemble a park and in the center was an elevated, circular stage with three ramps equally positioned on each side. Once inside the theater, Mr. Peek-A-Boo greeted the children and asked them to use their imagination again to make Barney appear by chanting the dinosaur's name. After the lights dimmed and soft music played as stars appeared in the darkness, Barney appeared in the middle of the stage and his theme song "Barney Is A Dinosaur" played in the background as the show began. Barney then performed two songs "If You're Happy and You Know It", then "Imagine a Place". Baby Bop and BJ joined Barney on stage to sing "Mr. Knickerbocker", "Down on Grandpa's Farm" and "If All the Raindrops". After the songs, Barney exclaimed he had a wonderful time with all of the children, and that only one song was left to finish off the day. The three dinosaurs held hands, and began singing "I Love You". Baby Bop and BJ made their exits, while Barney ended the show by saying, "And remember, I love you," and blew a kiss goodbye.

Post-show
After the show, guests exited out into Barney's Backyard, an indoor activity center for children, where they also got their picture taken with Barney.

Setlist
 Barney Theme Song
 If You're Happy and You Know It
 Imagine a Place
 Mr. Knickerbocker
 Down on Grandpa's Farm
 If All the Raindrops
 I Love You

Christmas Show

1995
 Barney Theme Song
 Jingle Bells
 Holidays Around the World: O Tannenbaum, My Dreidel, Feliz Navidad 
 Up on the Housetop
 Let it Snow! Let it Snow! Let it Snow!
 I Love You
 We Wish You a Merry Christmas

1996–2019
 Barney Theme Song
 Jingle Bells
 Frosty the Snowman
 Mr. Knickerbocker
 Down on Grandpa's Farm
 Let it Snow! Let it Snow! Let it Snow!
 I Love You
 We Wish You a Merry Christmas

Closure
On March 16, 2020, due to the COVID-19 pandemic in Florida, the show was temporarily closed along with the rest of the Universal Orlando Resort. It reopened during the resort's reopening in June 2020 but was closed again on August 9, 2020, which was temporary at the time. On February 3, 2021, Universal Orlando publicly announced on their Twitter account that the show had permanently closed, effective that day. The entire Barney courtyard was removed of its theming and the indoor theater and stage was repurposed to DreamWorks Destination, an indoor meet-and-greet with characters from DreamWorks Animation franchises, such as Po from Kung Fu Panda, Princess Poppy from Trolls, King Julien from Madagascar, among others from each franchise.

References

External links
A Day in the Park With Barney at Orlando Rocks
A Day in the Park with Barney at Universal Orlando Resort

Barney & Friends
Amusement rides introduced in 1995
Amusement rides that closed in 2021
Universal Studios Florida
Universal Parks & Resorts attractions by name
Licensed properties at Universal Parks & Resorts
Amusement rides based on television franchises
Former Universal Studios Florida attractions
1995 establishments in Florida
2021 disestablishments in Florida